Springdale Township may refer to:

 Springdale Township, Washington County, Arkansas, in Washington County, Arkansas
 Springdale Township, Cedar County, Iowa
 Springdale Township, Sumner County, Kansas, Arkansas, in Sumner County, Kansas
 Springdale Township, Manistee County, Michigan
 Springdale Township, Redwood County, Minnesota
 Springdale Township, Valley County, Nebraska
 Springdale Township, Allegheny County, Pennsylvania
 Springdale Township, Lincoln County, South Dakota, in Lincoln County, South Dakota
 Springdale Township, Roberts County, South Dakota, in Roberts County, South Dakota

See also 

Springdale (disambiguation)

Township name disambiguation pages